The Blériot XXXVI Torpille was an observation monoplane designed in France by Louis Bleriot during the early 1910s. The Blériot XXXVIbis La Vache was operated by Jules Védrines on several daring missions behind enemy lines in the early months of the war.

Specifications

References

Single-engined tractor aircraft
Blériot aircraft
Rotary-engined aircraft
Aircraft first flown in 1912